Throughout its history, Tucson, Arizona has had a large and influential Mexican American community. Tucson was majority Mexican/Mexican American even by the early 20th century.

Most people of Mexican descent who have lived in Tucson for generations identify as Tucsonenses. This local identity stresses a connection to the city and influenced Thomas E. Sheridan to title his well-received book, Los Tucsonenses.

By 2018, the city's demographics have again changed and the percentage of Mexican and Mexican Americans are moving toward becoming the majority population. The 5 largest ethnic groups in Tucson, AZ are White (Non-Hispanic) (43.6%), White (Hispanic) (26.2%), Other (Hispanic) (10.1%), Black or African American (Non-Hispanic) (5.25%), and Two+ (Hispanic) (4.13%). NaNk% of the people in Tucson, AZ speak a non-English language, and 91.2% are U.S. citizens.

In 2019, Regina Romero was elected Tucson's mayor. No Mexican American had held that office since 1875, when Arizona was still a territory and Estevan Ochoa won the mayoral race by a landslide.

See also
 History of Tucson, Arizona

Notes

Further reading
 Otero, Lydia R. (2010). La Calle: Spatial Conflicts and Urban Renewal in a Southwest City. Tucson: University of Arizona Press. .

History of Tucson, Arizona
Mexican-American history
Tucson